Protostrigidae is a prehistoric family of owls which occurred in North America, Europe, and Asia during the Eocene and early Oligocene periods. Genera include Eostrix, Minerva, Oligostrix, and Primoptynx. In 1983, Cécile Mourer-Chauviré demonstrated that Protostrix is a junior synonym of Minerva.

Protostrigidae characteristics include strong first and second toes as well as a widened medial condyle of the tibiotarsus.

References 

 
Eocene birds of North America
Eocene birds of Europe
Eocene animals of Asia
Prehistoric bird families